Vijaya College is an educational institution in Bengaluru in the Indian state of Karnataka. It was established in 1942. It is one of the oldest colleges in India. In 1946, Bangalore Intermediate College was renamed as Vijaya College. In 1947, the present campus area measuring 450 ft X 500 ft was sanctioned by the City Municipality, Bangalore. A building was constructed to house the college in the new campus by January 1953. The college offers Science,  Commerce,  Computer Applications and IT, Management and Business Administration Courses.

History 

In the early 1940s, only two colleges, Government Intermediate college and St. Joseph's college, were in the entire city of Bangalore. Admission to Government College was difficult because of less student intake and admission to St. Joseph's college was beyond the reach of many students. Citing this hardship, a group of people came together and mooted the idea of starting a new educational institution. The group included Rao Bahadur Prof B. Venkateshachar, Prof V.T. Srinivasan, Sri K. Lakshminarayana Rao, Sri K. Srinivasa Rao, Sri.C.R. Narayana Rao and others. BHS managing committee was constituted in 1944. The occasional contributions of other educationists such as Sri K.N.Guruswamy, Sri Rao Bahadur Dharma Prakasha L.S. Venkoji Rao, Sri H.Ramaswamy and Col. G.S.Subba Rao aided the effort.

Degree classes began in 1956. Initially B.Sc. course with Physics, Chemistry and Mathematics combination were started, followed by a Chemistry, Botany and Zoology combination. In 1970, a Bachelor of Commerce course was started.

During the 1980s the college started new B.Sc. combinations:

 Physics, Mathematics and Electronics.
 Physics, Mathematics and Computer Science.
 Chemistry, Botany or Zoology and Sericulture.
 Physics, Mathematics and Electronics.
 Physics, Mathematics and Computer Science.
 Chemistry, Botany or Zoology and Sericulture.

Vijaya College expanded its infrastructure to accommodate a steep increase in enrollment. Nearly 5000 students have attended Vijaya College.

The college was split in 2002 into Degree and PU colleges. Vijaya College is now a full-fledged Degree college.

Leadership 

B. V Narayana Rao guides the institution as the secretary of BHS Higher Education Society. The President is Dr. N. S. Sundara Rajan.

The BHS Managing Committee started the Bangalore Intermediate College in Vokkaligara Sangha Campus, Vishveswarapuram, Bangalore with two sections of 60 students each.

Notable alumni
 Rishab Shetty, Actor
 Chiranjeevi Sarja, Actor
 Srujan Lokesh  , Actor
 Naveen Krishna, Actor
 Ambareesh, Actor
 H D Kumaraswamy, Politician
 Prakash Nanjappa, Olympian
 P. C. Mohan, politician
 Shalini, TV Actress

References

External links

 Bengaluru History

Educational institutions established in 1942
Colleges in Bangalore
1942 establishments in India